My Name Is America is a series of historical novels published by Scholastic Press.  Each book is written in the form of a journal of a fictional young man's life during an important event or time period in American history. The series was discontinued in 2004.

Books
The Journal of William Thomas Emerson: A Revolutionary War Patriot, Boston, Massachusetts, 1774 by Barry Denenberg (September 1998)
The Journal of James Edmond Pease: A Civil War Union Soldier, Virginia, 1863 by Jim Murphy (September 1998)
The Journal of Joshua Loper: A Black Cowboy, The Chisholm Trail, 1871 by Walter Dean Myers (April 1999)
The Journal of Scott Pendleton Collins: A World War II Soldier, Normandy, France, 1944 by Walter Dean Myers (June 1999)
The Journal of Sean Sullivan: A Transcontinental Railroad Worker, Nebraska and Points West, 1867 by William Durbin (September 1999)
The Journal of Ben Uchida: Citizen 13559, Mirror Lake Internment Camp, California, 1942 by Barry Denenberg (September 1999)
The Journal of Wong Ming-Chung: A Chinese Miner, California, 1852 by Laurence Yep (April 2000)
The Journal of Jasper Jonathan Pierce: A Pilgrim boy, Plymouth, 1620 by Ann Rinaldi (July 2000)
The Journal of Augustus Pelletier: Lewis and Clark Expedition, 1804 by Kathryn Lasky (September 2000)
The Journal of Otto Peltonen: A Finnish Immigrant, Hibbing, Minnesota, 1905 by William Durbin (September 2000)
The Journal of Biddy Owens: The Negro Leagues, Birmingham, Alabama, 1948 by Walter Dean Myers (April 2001)
The Journal of Jesse Smoke: A Cherokee Boy, The Trail of Tears, 1838 by Joseph Bruchac (June 2001)
The Journal of Douglas Allen Deeds: The Donner Party Expedition, 1846 by Rodman Philbrick (November 2001)
The Journal of C.J. Jackson: A Dust Bowl Migrant, Oklahoma to California, 1935 by William Durbin (April 2002)
The Journal of Patrick Seamus Flaherty: United States Marine Corps, Khe Sanh, Vietnam, 1968 by Ellen Emerson White (June 2002)
The Journal of Jedediah Barstow: An Emigrant on the Oregon Trail, Overland, 1845 by Ellen Levine (September 2002)
The Journal of Finn Reardon: A Newsie, New York City, 1899 by Susan Campbell Bartoletti (May 2003)
The Journal of Rufus Rowe: A Witness to the Battle of Fredericksburg, Bowling Green, Virginia, 1862 by Sid Hite (October 2003)
The Journal of Brian Doyle: A Greenhorn on an Alaskan Whaling Ship, The Florence, 1874 by Jim Murphy (April 2004)

2012 reissue

The series was reissued since March 2012.

We Were Heroes: The Journal of Scott Pendleton Collins, a World War II Soldier, Normandy, France, 1944 by Walter Dean Myers (March 2012)
Into No Man's Land: The Journal of Patrick Seamus Flaherty, United States Marine Corps, Khe Sanh, Vietnam, 1968 by Ellen Emerson White (June 2012)
On Enemy Soil: The Journal of James Edmond Pease, a Civil War Union Soldier, Virginia, 1863 by Jim Murphy (September 2012)
A True Patriot: The Journal of William Thomas Emerson, a Revolutionary War Patriot, Boston, Massachusetts, 1774 by Barry Denenberg (December 2012)
Down to the Last Out: The Journal of Biddy Owens, the Negro Leagues, Birmingham, Alabama, 1948 by Walter Dean Myers (January 2013)
Until the Last Spike: The Journal of Sean Sullivan, a Transcontinental Railroad Worker, Nebraska and Points West, 1867 by William Durbin (September 2013)
Staking a Claim: The Journal of Wong Ming-Chung, a Chinese Miner, California, 1852 by Laurence Yep (November 2013)
On This Long Journey: The Journal of Jesse Smoke, a Cherokee Boy, The Trail of Tears, 1838 by Joseph Bruchac (January 2014)
Blazing West: The Journal of Augustus Pelletier, Lewis and Clark Expedition, 1804 by Kathryn Lasky (February 2014)
Stay Alive: The Journal of Douglas Allen Deeds, The Donner Party Expedition, 1846 by Rodman Philbrick (December 2021)

See also
Dear America
My America
The Royal Diaries

External links
publisher website

Series of children's books
Young adult novel series
Children's historical novels
American historical novels
American children's novels
Fictional diaries